Aleksandr Vladimirovich Smirnov (born 19 May 1968) is a Russian professional football coach and a former player. He is the head coach of the Under-19 squad of FC Torpedo Moscow.

Club career
As a player, he made his debut in the Soviet Top League in 1988 for FC Dynamo Moscow.

Honours
 Soviet Top League bronze: 1990.
 Russian Premier League runner-up: 1994, 1995.
 Russian Premier League bronze: 1998.
 Russian Cup winner: 1996, 1997.
 Russian Cup finalist: 1998.

European club competitions
 1993–94 UEFA Cup with FC Lokomotiv Moscow: 2 games.
 1994–95 UEFA Cup with FC Dynamo Moscow: 2 games, 1 goal.
 1996–97 UEFA Cup Winners' Cup with FC Lokomotiv Moscow: 1 game.
 1997–98 UEFA Cup Winners' Cup with FC Lokomotiv Moscow: 7 games (reached semifinal).

References

1968 births
Footballers from Moscow
Living people
Soviet footballers
Russian footballers
FC Dynamo Moscow players
FC Lokomotiv Moscow players
Russian Premier League players
Soviet Top League players
FC Dinamo Sukhumi players
FC Moscow players
Russian football managers
Association football midfielders
FC Yenisey Krasnoyarsk players
FC FShM Torpedo Moscow players